Mariusz Zbigniew Pudzianowski (born 7 February 1977), also known as "Pudzian" and "Dominator", is a Polish entrepreneur, mixed martial artist and former strongman competitor. With 43 international victories at a record 70% winning percentage in his strongman career he is considered by many to be one of the greatest strength athletes of all time. 

During his career as a strongman, Pudzianowski won five World's Strongest Man titles, the most in history. He also won two runner-up titles in 2006 and 2009 and made 9 out of 9 appearances into the World's Strongest Man final. He also won the Europe's Strongest Man a record, 6 times. In 2009, Pudzianowski debuted as a mixed martial artist. He is currently ranked #5 in the KSW Heavyweight rankings.

Early years
Mariusz Pudzianowski was born in Biała Rawska, Poland. His father, Wojciech, was a weightlifter. Pudzianowski quickly became interested in sports. Since the age of 11, he has been training the Kyokushin style of karate. His current grade is 4th kyu green belt. He began strength training at the age of thirteen. When he was fifteen, Pudzianowski also started training boxing, quitting after seven years. Pudzianowski debuted in professional sports at the age of sixteen, taking part in Polish Weightlifting Championship, in the bench press event.

Imprisonment
In 2000 and 2001, Pudzianowski spent 19 months in Łowicz prison for assault. In an interview, he said he wanted to stop a "local mafia boss", and he got accused of assault and stealing his golden chain. Pudzianowski was incarcerated in prison in Łowicz. Several years later he arranged a resocialization meeting for the prisoners at the same penal institution.

Strongman career

On 1 May 1999 Pudzianowski entered his first Strongman competition, held in Płock, Poland. He achieved his first major success at the international level at the 2000 World's Strongest Man contest where he finished fourth in his first WSM competition. Due to his prison sentence, he did not return for the 2001 competition.

Pudzianowski returned at the 2002 World's Strongest Man and won his first title. He retained his title at the 2003 World's Strongest Man with an event to spare, winning by the largest margin ever achieved in the competition; across the seven disciplines in the final, he scored a remarkable four first place finishes, two second place finishes and one third place finish, resulting in the points margin between first and second (20) being greater than the margin between second and ninth (18). British strongman Laurence Shahlaei has since called this performance the most dominant victory ever seen at a World's Strongest Man event. In March 2004, he also became the Strongman Super Series World Champion.

He initially finished third in the 2004 World's Strongest Man but was later disqualified for breaching the governing body's Strongman Health Policy. He was forced to return his prize money, stripped of the International Federation of Strength Athletes points from the event, and received a one-year ban from competition. Pudzianowski did not dispute his banned substance violation and waived his right to have his stool sample verified.

In 2005, he made his return to World's Strongest Man event. After a slow start in the final's first two events, after which he found himself 7 points behind the leader in seventh place, he proceeded to dominate the rest of the event with five first place finishes in a row in the final five disciplines, winning the title with an event to spare.

In the 2006 World's Strongest Man contest, despite starting the final well, he eventually came second to Phil Pfister after the American won the final five events in a row. Pudzianowski regained his title in 2007, winning the final with one event to spare for a record-breaking third time. In so doing, he joined Jon Pall Sigmarsson and Magnus Ver Magnusson as the only men to win the competition four times. During the 2007 competition, however, Pudzianowski said that his target was to become the only person to win the event five times, and he returned to the 2008 World's Strongest Man the following year to try and achieve his goal.

Despite a serious calf injury, which he suffered in the Polish Strongman Championship Cup of 2008 and further exacerbated during the WSM qualifying rounds, seriously threatening his chance of even reaching the final, Pudzianowski still managed to win his heat and qualify for the final, but it was clear his dominance of previous years was no longer in effect. Trailing leader Derek Poundstone with two events to go, Pudzianowski managed to win the Plane Pull despite his injured calf to cut the deficit to just 1 point going into the final event. Matched up against Poundstone in the Atlas Stones in a 'winner-take-all' scenario, Pudzianowski managed to beat his American rival by the narrowest of margins to become the first and still only man to win five World's Strongest Man titles.

He competed in the 2009 World's Strongest Man competition the following year which took place in Malta, trying to win a remarkable sixth title in 8 years. He eventually placed second after Žydrūnas Savickas returned to the competition to win the title for the first time. Following the competition, Pudzianowski said  in an interview that he would not continue participating in strongman events, because of his career in Mixed Martial Arts, which required totally different training to strongman.

Personal records
Bench press –  
Squat –  
Deadlift –  
Loglift –

Achievements as a strongman

Professional Competitive Record (both international & national) – 1st (58), 2nd (10), 3rd (1) – Out of Total (77)

Mixed martial arts
In 2009, Pudzianowski signed a contract with Konfrontacja Sztuk Walki – a Polish mixed martial arts organization – to take part in four fights.

He debuted as a mixed martial arts fighter on 11 December 2009, during the KSW 12 event in Warsaw, Poland, winning against Marcin Najman. Pudzianowski started throwing low kicks soon after the fight began. After several hits, Najman fell to the mat and Pudzianowski started delivering punches (a tactic known as ground-and-pound). Najman was forced to tap the mat, indicating he wanted to end the fight, which lasted for only 43 seconds. Pudzianowski collected 200,000 zlotys (US$70,000) for the fight.

On 7 May 2010, during the KSW 13 event, Pudzianowski won his second fight, against Yusuke Kawaguchi. The fight lasted two full rounds, with Pudzianowski winning by judges' decision. The fight was described as a "sloppy brawl". It was noted Pudzianowski had control over most of the fight, but was "neutralized" by Kawaguchi, and that, by the second round, he was looking "to be out of energy and breathing heavily".

On 21 May 2010, Pudzianowski went on to participate in the Moosin: God of Martial Arts event, where he fought former two time UFC Heavyweight Champion Tim Sylvia. Pudzianowski fractured his metatarsus during the first round and then went on to deplete his stamina during the rest of the fight, which ultimately led to Sylvia defeating him via submission at 1:43 of round 2.

Following his loss to Sylvia in May, Pudzianowski signed to face former heavyweight boxer and kickboxer Eric Esch, better known as 'Butterbean', at KSW 14 on 18 September. After several brief standup exchanges, Pudzianowski secured a takedown early in the fight and was then able to dominate Esch with ground and pound. Esch, unable to get back to his feet during the attack, tapped out to the strikes, making Pudzianowski the winner by submission at 1:15 of the first round. He came into the fight notably slimmer, having lost around 20 lbs from his previous fight. Many believe his large muscle mass to have caused his stamina problems in his earlier fights.

On 21 May 2011 Pudzianowski fought James Thompson at KSW 16, losing by arm triangle.

In September 2011 Mariusz Pudzianowski started professional training in the well known MMA camp in the USA – American Top Team.

Pudzianowski fought on the KSW 17 event, which was held on 26 November 2011. He faced James Thompson in a rematch. He won the fight via majority decision. This decision caused controversy as Thompson had virtually full control in both rounds, and after the fight Thompson, who was clearly angered by the decision, took the microphone from the announcer and launched a verbal assault directed at the promotion in which he ranted: "Fucking joke. Give Mariusz a big round of applause. Come on. What a fucking joke. I thought KSW was really trying to be serious. If you can watch that back and call that serious, then (looking at the promoter) you're fucked, and KSW is going down the fucking toilet." Two days later the promotion changed the result to a No Contest. During a conference held on 28 November, the ruling was deemed to be a "judge's error" and the fight result was changed.

Mariusz's next opponent was Bob Sapp in a fight took place in Lodz, Poland on KSW 19 on 12 May 2012. Mariusz won via a TKO in the first round, battering Sapp with a barrage of punching and securing a takedown followed with more punches to win just 39 seconds into the fight.

Mariusz then faced Christos Piliafas on 15 September in the main event of KSW 20. Mariusz won via TKO in the first round, after dominating Piliafas on his feet, he then secured a takedown followed by posturing up and raining down some ground and pound to win at 3:48 seconds into the fight.

On 8 June 2013, Pudzianowski fought Sean McCorkle at KSW 23, losing the bout in the first round by kimura submission. Pudzianowski fought McCorkle again in a rematch on 28 September at KSW 24, avenging his loss via unanimous decision. After the second fight, Sean McCorkle expressed interest in a third fight.

On 17 May 2014 at KSW 27, Pudzianowski defeated Oli Thompson via a 2nd round unanimous decision. During the fight, Pudzianowski was able to gain points by controlling the entire fight through landing punches and securing multiple takedowns in both rounds eventually leading to his victory. At the end, Thompson requested a rematch, to which Pudzianowski agreed.

On 6 December 2014, Pudzianowski defeated the olympic veteran Paweł Nastula via unanimous decision on KSW 29's co-main event. It was his third win in a row.

Pudzianowski next fought Rolles Gracie Jr. in KSW 31, on 23 May 2015 in Gdańsk, Poland. He defeated Gracie Jr. via knockout in the 1st round, winning the Knockout of the Night bonus award with the performance.

At KSW 32 on 31 October 2015, Pudzianowski lost to Peter Graham via TKO in the second round.

Then on 27 May 2016 at KSW 35 against Marcin Różalski, he lost also in the second round this time by guillotine choke.

In his next fight in KSW 37 on 3 December 2016 Pudzianowski defeated Paweł Mikołajuw with TKO in the first round.

On 27 May 2017 at KSW 39 Pudzianowski defeated Tyberiusz Kowalczyk via submission to elbow strike in the second round.

Pudzianowski was expected to face James McSweeney at KSW 40 on 22 October 2017. However, after McSweeney was medically cleared, he eventually faced Jay Silva and won by majority decision.

Mariusz faced Karol Bedorf on 9 June 2018 at KSW 44: The Game. He lost the bout via first round kimura.

Mariusz faced Szymon Kołecki in a heavyweight bout at KSW 47 on March 23, 2019. Pudzianowski lost the fight after suffering a leg injury in the first round.

Winning streak 
Next, Pudzian faced former bodybuilder Erko Jun on 9 November 2019 at KSW 51: Croatia. He won the bout via second round TKO.

Pudzianowski was then scheduled to headline KSW 53 against Quentin Domingos on March 21, 2020 before the bout was scrapped due to Pudzianowski's injury.

Pudzianowski was set to return after a fifteen month layoff  against the undefeated Senegalese heavyweight Serigne Ousmane at KSW 59: Fight Code on 20 March 2021. However, on the day of the fight, Ousmane Dia suffered an acute appendicitis attack and had to be hospitalized.  Stepping in on just a few hours notice was Serbia's Nikola Milanovic. Pudzianowski won the bout via TKO in the first round.

Pudzianowski faced KSW 1 tournament winner Łukasz Jurkowski on 5 June 2021 at KSW 63: Crime of The Century. Pudzianowski won the fight via TKO in the 3rd round.

The fight with Serigne Ousmane Dia was then rebooked and took place at  KSW 64: Przybysz vs. Santos on 23 October 2021. Pudzianowski won the fight via knockout 18 seconds into round one.

Pudzianowski faced former KSW Middleweight champion Michał Materla at KSW 70: Pudzianowski vs. Materla on 28 May 2022. He won the bout in the first round, knocking out Materla with an uppercut. He was awarded the Knockout of the Night bonus with the win.

Pudzianowski faced former two-division champion Mamed Khalidov at KSW 77: Khalidov vs. Pudzianowski on December 17, 2022. Pudzian's 6-win streak was ended after he tapped to ground and pound in the first round.

Championships and accomplishments 
Konfrontacja Sztuk Walki
Knockout of the Night (Two times) vs. Rolles Gracie Jr. and Michal Materla
Most wins in Konfrontacja Sztuk Walki heavyweight history (17).
Most knockouts in Konfrontacja Sztuk Walki heavyweight history (12).
Most knockouts in Konfrontacja Sztuk Walki history (12).
Third most wins in Konfrontacja Sztuk Walki history (17).
Third most fights in Konfrontacja Sztuk Walki history (24).
World MMA Awards
2021 Upset of the Year - Nominee

Mixed martial arts record

|-
|Loss
|align=center|17–8 (1)
|Mamed Khalidov
|TKO (submission to punches)
|KSW 77: Khalidov vs. Pudzianowski
|
|align=center|1
|align=center|1:54
|Gliwice, Poland
|
|-
|Win
|align=center|17–7 (1)
|Michał Materla
|KO (punch)
|KSW 70: Pudzianowski vs. Materla
|
|align=center|1
|align=center|1:47
|Łódź, Poland
|
|-
|Win
|align=center|16–7 (1)
|Serigne Ousmane Dia
|KO (punch)
|KSW 64: Przybysz vs. Santos
|
|align=center| 1
|align=center| 0:18
|Łódź, Poland
|
|-
|Win
|align=center|15–7 (1)
|Łukasz Jurkowski
|TKO (punches)
|KSW 61: To Fight or Not To Fight
|
|align=center| 3
|align=center| 1:32
|Gdańsk, Poland
|
|-
|Win
|align=center|14–7 (1)
|Nikola Milanović
|TKO (punches)
|KSW 59: Fight Code
|
|align=center| 1
|align=center| 1:10
|Łódź, Poland
|
|-
|Win
|align=center|13–7 (1)
| Erko Jun
|TKO (punches)
|KSW 51: Croatia
|
|align=center|2
|align=center|1:43
|Zagreb, Croatia
|
|-
| Loss
| align=center|12–7 (1)
| Szymon Kołecki
| TKO (leg injury)
| |KSW 47: The X-Warriors
| 
| align=center|1
| align=center|4:29
| Łódź, Poland
|
|-
| Loss
| align=center|12–6 (1)
| Karol Bedorf
| Submission (kimura)
| KSW 44: The Game
| 
| align=center|1
| align=center|1:51
| Gdańsk, Poland
|
|-
| Win
| align=center| 12–5 (1)
| Jay Silva
| Decision (majority)
| KSW 40: Dublin 
| 
| align=center|3
| align=center|5:00
| Dublin, Ireland
|
|-
| Win
| align=center| 11–5 (1)
| Tyberiusz Kowalczyk
| TKO (submission to punches)
| KSW 39: Colosseum
| 
| align=center| 2
| align=center| 2:50
| Warsaw, Poland
|
|-
| Win
| align=center| 10–5 (1)
| Paweł Mikołajuw
| TKO (punches)
| KSW 37: Circus of Pain
| 
| align=center| 1
| align=center| 1:20
| Kraków, Poland
|
|-
| Loss
| align=center|9–5 (1)
| Marcin Różalski
| Submission (guillotine choke)
| KSW 35: Khalidov vs. Karaoglu
| 
| align=center|2
| align=center|1:46
| Gdańsk/Sopot, Poland
|
|-
| Loss
| align=center|9–4 (1)
| Peter Graham
| TKO (punches and elbows)
| KSW 32: Road To Wembley
| 
| align=center|2
| align=center|2:00
| London, England
|
|-
| Win
| align=center| 9–3 (1)
| Rolles Gracie Jr.
| KO (punch)
| KSW 31: Materla vs. Drwal
| 
| align=center| 1
| align=center| 0:27
| Gdańsk, Poland
| 
|-
| Win
| align=center| 8–3 (1)
| Paweł Nastula
| Decision (unanimous)
| KSW 29: Reload
| 
| align=center| 3
| align=center| 3:00
| Kraków, Poland
|
|-
| Win
| align=center| 7–3 (1)
| Oli Thompson
| Decision (unanimous)
| KSW 27: Cage Time
| 
| align=center| 2
| align=center| 5:00
| Gdańsk, Poland
|
|-
| Win
| align=center| 6–3 (1)
| Sean McCorkle
| Decision (unanimous)
| KSW 24: Clash of the Giants
| 
| align=center| 2
| align=center| 5:00
| Łódź, Poland
|
|-
| Loss
| align=center| 5–3 (1)
| Sean McCorkle
| Submission (kimura)
| KSW 23: Khalidov vs. Manhoef
| 
| align=center| 1
| align=center| 1:57
| Gdańsk, Poland
|
|-
| Win
| align=center| 5–2 (1)
| Christos Piliafas
| TKO (punches)
| KSW 20: Fighting Symphonies
| 
| align=center| 1
| align=center| 3:48
| Gdańsk, Poland
|
|-
| Win
| align=center| 4–2 (1)
| Bob Sapp
| TKO (punches)
| KSW 19: Pudzianowski vs. Sapp
| 
| align=center| 1
| align=center| 0:39
| Łódź, Poland
|
|-
| NC
| align=center| 3–2 (1)
| James Thompson
| NC (overturned)
| KSW 17: Revenge
| 
| align=center| 2
| align=center| 5:00
| Łódź, Poland
| 
|-
| Loss
| align=center| 3–2
| James Thompson
| Submission (arm-triangle choke)
| KSW 16: Khalidov vs. Lindland
| 
| align=center| 2
| align=center| 1:06
| Gdańsk, Poland
|
|-
| Win
| align=center| 3–1
| Butterbean
| TKO (submission to punches)
| KSW 14: Judgment Day
| 
| align=center| 1
| align=center| 1:15
| Łódź, Poland
|
|-
| Loss
| align=center| 2–1
| Tim Sylvia
| TKO (submission to punches)
| Moosin: God of Martial Arts
| 
| align=center| 2
| align=center| 1:43
| Worcester, Massachusetts, United States
|
|-
| Win
| align=center| 2–0
| Yusuke Kawaguchi
| Decision (unanimous)
| KSW 13: Kumite
| 
| align=center| 2
| align=center| 5:00
| Katowice, Poland
|
|-
| Win
| align=center| 1–0
| Marcin Najman
| TKO (submission to punches)
| KSW 12: Pudzianowski vs. Najman
| 
| align=center| 1
| align=center| 0:43
| Warsaw, Poland
|

Outside professional sports

Education
On 27 May 2008 Pudzianowski graduated with a master's degree in international relations. His thesis was: "Organizational culture in sports marketing in the world".

Business
In an interview in 2009 Mariusz said that he treats the sport as a hobby. He is not doing it for money, as the money is relatively low in Strongman and MMA (he said that the winner of World's Strongest Man can get US$60,000, and the winner of Grand Prix in the US can get anywhere from US$100,000 to $150,000). He owns a very successful company (a school for bodyguards) as well as real estate. Those are his main sources of money. Pudzianowski also owns a truck cargo company named Pudzianowski Transport.

Musical career
Pudzianowski often appears as a guest singer in the musical group Pudzian Band, formed by his brother Krystian. Their first single "Zdobyć świat", was released in 2006. In 2009, the group released an album, Dawaj na ring (Go, hit the ring).

Celebrity status
In 2008, Pudzianowski took part in the 7th season of Dancing with the Stars in his native Poland. He advanced to the final episode, but ultimately finished second, losing to actress Magdalena Walach. Pudzianowski was a contestant in the 1st season of the singing reality show Just the Two of Us in Poland. He was coupled with former Ich Troje singer Anna Wiśniewska.

Rugby

Pudzianowski is also a keen amateur rugby union player, and plays with Blachy Pruszyński Budowlani Łódź.

Strongman diet
Pudzianowski is liberal with his diet and is often seen eating chocolate, ice cream or burgers. On one of the World Strongman events shown on TV, and an interview for MTV, when asked about his diet he said: "I eat everything. I do not follow any particular diet. I eat anything I want, anytime I want".

He said for MTV that he prefers Polish cuisine. When he has some time he often cooks himself, as he does not particularly fancy meals from restaurants. He often eats bigos, Polish soups, Polish sausages and typical Polish dinners with cooked potatoes, 200–300 g of meat and some salads (usually cucumber salad).

In an interview at the beginning of his world strongman career he said that his supplements, training, massages, etc. costs him approximately 6000 złoty (ca. U.S. $2,000) per month.

Commercials
 "Dominator" – an energy drink using Pudzianowski's profile is being distributed in Poland.
 Mariusz appeared in a Met-rx commercial which aired during the U.S. broadcast of the 2007 World's Strongest Man contest.

See also
 List of current KSW fighters
 List of male mixed martial artists
List of strongmen
List of Poles

Footnotes

External links

  

1977 births
Heavyweight mixed martial artists
Living people
Mixed martial artists utilizing Kyokushin kaikan
Mixed martial artists utilizing Brazilian jiu-jitsu
People from Rawa County
Polish male karateka
Polish practitioners of Brazilian jiu-jitsu
Polish male mixed martial artists
Polish rugby union players
Polish sportspeople in doping cases
Polish strength athletes
Polish powerlifters
Sportspeople from Łódź Voivodeship
Super heavyweight mixed martial artists